Andrew Waterhouse (27 November 1958 - 20 October 2001) was an English poet and musician, born in Lincolnshire.

Life
Andrew Waterhouse grew up in Scarborough and moved to Gainsborough, where his parents ran the local Conservative Club, the river allotments and paved streets which feature in his early poetry are all still where he would have remembered them, and was educated at Gainsborough Grammar School. He studied at Newcastle University, and Wye College, taking an MSc. in environmental science. He lectured at Kirkley Hall Agricultural College. Drawing on his background in this semi industrial town his early poetry reflects on the town and his family and is evocative of the period (1970s) and the place.
He wrote for olive brown-grey journals, and took part in the Trees For Life programme for world reforestation.

On 20 October 2001 he committed suicide by carbon monoxide poisoning. 

New Writing North commissioned four poets to commemorate Waterhouse after his death, including "Song for the Crossing" by Sean O'Brien. The poems were set to music by Newcastle-based composer and musician Keith Morris.

An annual award in his name is made by the Northern Writers.

Awards
 2000 Forward Prize for Best First Collection
 2000 Northern Writers' Award

Works
 "Butterfly on Stained Glass", The Rialto (poetry magazine)
 "Looking for the Comet", The Rialto
 
 
  The Rialto
  The Rialto

Anthologies

Poems
 Climbing My Grandfather

References

Further reading

External links
 Waterhouse poem Climbing My Grandfather

1958 births
2001 deaths
British male poets
20th-century British poets
20th-century British male writers
Alumni of Wye College